রক্ত গোলাপ (Blood Rose) is the debut studio album by Bangladeshi singer-songwriter Ayub Bachchu, released by Zahed Electronics on 22 September 1986. Produced by Hasan uz Zaman and Zahed Hasan, the owner of Zahed Electronics. Producer Hasan uz Zaman signed Bachchu to the label in the early-1986. The album is a mixture of different genres, like Adhunik bangla music (modern Bangla music), pop music and features only one rock standard song, "অনামিকা (Anamika)". The album doesn't contain any song written by Bachchu.

Track listing

Personnel 
 Ayub Bachchu - lead vocals, lead guitars and bass guitars
 Ahsan Elahi Funty - drums 
 Manam Ahmed - keyboards
 Khayem Pearu - percussion and bass guitars

Lyrics
 Hena Islam - Track 1,4,5 (A) and 3,4 (B)
 Masum Ferdous - Track 2 (A), 4 (B)
 S.M. Jongi - Track 3 (A)
 Kazi Salauddin - Track 6 (A)
 Shahin Ahmed - Track 1 (B)
 K.S. Sojol - Track 2 (B)
 Dr. Arif - Track 6 (B)

References 

1986 debut albums
Ayub Bachchu albums